Henry Clarke may refer to:

Henry Clarke (mathematician) (1743–1818), English mathematician
Henry Clarke (Australian politician) (1822–1907),  member of the New South Wales (Australia) Parliament
Henry Edward Clarke (1829–1892), businessman and politician in Ontario, Canada
Henry Clarke (London politician) (died 1914), businessman and member of the City of London Corporation and London County Council
Henry Joseph Clarke (1833–1889), Premier of Manitoba, Canada, 1874–1878
Henry Butler Clarke (1863–1904), lecturer on Spanish at the University of Oxford
Henry Lee Clarke (born 1941), American diplomat
Henry Lowther Clarke (1850–1926), English-born Anglican archbishop of Melbourne, Australia, 1905–1920
Henry Clarke (baseball) (1875–1950), American baseball pitcher
Henry Clarke (racing driver), American racecar driver in USAC and Indy Lights
Henry Clarke Wright (1797–1870), American abolitionist and pacifist
Mrs. Henry Clarke (1853–1908), English writer of children's books
Henry Patrick Clarke (1889–1931), Irish stained-glass artist and book illustrator
Henry Clarke (American businessman) (1933–2013), American businessman and venture capitalist
Henry Wilberforce Clarke (1840–1905), translator of Persian works by mystic poets
Henry Clarke (photographer) (1917–1996), American fashion photographer
Henry T. Clarke Sr. (1834–1913), American businessman, pioneer, and politician from Nebraska

See also
Henri Jacques Guillaume Clarke (1765–1818), duc de Feltre, French Minister of War, 1807–1814
Henry Clark (disambiguation)
Harry Clarke (disambiguation)
Henry Clerke (disambiguation)